Liepana lugubris is a species of tephritid or fruit flies in the genus Hendrella of the family Tephritidae.

Distribution
Australia.

References

Tephritinae
Insects described in 1847
Diptera of Australasia